During the 1994–95 English football season, Crystal Palace competed in the FA Premier League.

Season summary
Crystal Palace returned to the Premiership a year after leaving it, and, over the next few months, they would experience one of the most unusual seasons in their history. They were the division's lowest scoring team with just 34 goals, but reached the semi-finals of both cup competitions. They also finished fourth from bottom in the Premiership, which – due to the streamlining of the division to 20 clubs – cost them their top flight status. Manager Alan Smith was sacked just days afterwards, with Steve Coppell returning to the manager's seat two years after handing the reins over to his former assistant Smith.

The aftermath of Palace's relegation saw the sale of numerous players including Richard Shaw, John Salako, Chris Armstrong and Gareth Southgate. A barely recognisable Palace squad would kick off the Endsleigh League Division One campaign with one of the youngest-ever squads to be faced with a challenge for promotion to the Premiership.

Final league table

Results summary

Results by round

Results
Crystal Palace's score comes first

Legend

FA Premier League

FA Cup

League Cup

Players

First-team squad
Squad at end of season

Left club during season

Reserve squad

Transfers

In

Out

Transfers in:  £1,830,000
Transfers out:  £740,000
Total spending:  £1,090,000

Notes

References

Crystal Palace F.C. seasons
Crystal Palace